Rhododendron myrtifolium (syn. Rhododendron kotschyi) is a species of flowering plant in the family Ericaceae. This evergreen shrub is common in the high mountain ranges of Eastern Europe, particularly Bulgaria, Romania and Ukraine.

Synonyms
 Rhododendron ferrugineum (Schott & Kotschy) Hayek 1928
 Rhododendron kotschyi Simonk., 1887

References

myrtifolium
Flora of Eastern Europe
Flora of Bulgaria